Patrick Magee may refer to:

Patrick Magee (actor) (1922–1982), Northern Irish stage and film actor
Patrick Magee (Irish republican) (born 1951), member of the Provisional Irish Republican Army